The Caisse de la Dette Publique ("Public Debt Commission") was an international commission established by a decree issued by Khedive Ismail of Egypt on 2 May 1876 to supervise the payment by the Egyptian government of the loans to the European governments following the construction of the Suez Canal. 

It was initially led by a secretary and three commissioners representing the governments of Austria-Hungary, France and Italy; from 1877 the United Kingdom and from 1885 Russia and Germany. One of the Commissioners would serve as the President, or Chairman, of the Commission. 

"This system was under the control of two main countries, France and Britain. This system of 'dual control' represented Europeans direct intervention in Egypt's financial affairs."

The Public Debt Commission was abolished by a bilateral agreement between the British and the Egyptian governments, signed on 17 July 1940, due to Allied interest in improving relations with Cairo during the Second World War.

See also
 Ottoman Public Debt Administration 
 International Financial Control of the Kingdom of Greece
 Moroccan Debt Administration

Notes

External links 
 Text of the Anglo-Egyptian agreement of 1940

19th century in Egypt
Suez Canal
Organizations established in 1876
Organizations disestablished in 1940
1876 establishments in Egypt